Parsha is a rural locality (a selo) in Krasnoselskoye Rural Settlement, Yuryev-Polsky District, Vladimir Oblast, Russia. The population was 10 as of 2010.

Geography 
Parsha is located on the Lipnya River, 23 km northeast from Yuryev-Polsky (the district's administrative centre) by road. Shipilovo is the nearest rural locality.

References 

Rural localities in Yuryev-Polsky District